Mary A. Turzillo (born 1940) is an American science fiction writer noted primarily for short stories.  She won the Nebula Award for Best Novelette in 2000 for her story Mars is No Place for Children, published originally in Science Fiction Age, and her story "Pride," published originally in Fast Forward 1, was a Nebula award finalist for best short story of 2007.

She was formerly a professor of English at Kent State University, where she wrote articles and several books of science fiction criticism under the name Mary T. Brizzi, including Reader's Guide to Anne McCaffrey and Reader's Guide to Philip José Farmer.  She attended the Clarion Workshop in 1985, and she founded the Cajun Sushi Hamsters writing workshop in Cleveland, Ohio.

Fiction
Although Mary had published poetry and academic works before attending the Clarion Writers workshop, her main publications in science fiction occurred following Clarion, with the publication of the stories “What Do I See In You” in Writers of the Future Volume IV, and “Kings” in Pulphouse: the Hardback magazine.  After this her work appeared regularly in the SF magazines such as The Magazine of Fantasy & Science Fiction and Analog Science Fiction and Fact, as well as original anthologies such as Universe and Fast Forward.

Her first novel, An Old Fashioned Martian Girl was serialized in Analog magazine in 2004, and a revised version, Mars Girls, appeared from Apex in 2017. Her short story collection Bonsai Babies appeared from Omnium Gatherum in 2016. Her short story collection Cosmic Cats and Fantastic Furballs, a collection of science fiction and fantasy stories featuring cats, appeared from WordFire Press in 2022.

Poetry
Turzillo is also a poet, published in a number of national publications.  Her collection of poetry, Your Cat & Other Space Aliens, was published by VanZeno Press in 2007.  A collaborative collection of poetry and fiction, Dragon Soup (written with artist and poet Marge Simon), appeared from VanZeno in 2008, and another collaboration with Simon, The Dragon's Dictionary, was published by Sam's Dot in 2010.

She has won several Ohio Poetry Day awards.  She has won the Science Fiction Poetry Association's Elgin Award for best poetry book twice. In 2013, her collection Lovers and Killers (Dark Regions, 2012).  In 2015, her poetry book Sweet Poison, a collaboration with Marge Simon (Dark Renaissance Books, 2014) won the award.

Academic work
Turzillo has a Ph.D. in English from Case Western Reserve University, where her Ph.D. thesis was "The writer as double agent: essays on the conspiratorial mode in contemporary fiction." She worked as a professor in the English Department of the Trumbull Campus of Kent State University.  Under the name Mary T. Brizzi, she has published a number of papers in the area of science fiction criticism, and is the author of two books, Reader's Guide to Anne McCaffrey and Reader's Guide to Philip José Farmer.

Personal life
In her private life, Turzillo is a competitive fencer. In 2016, she was a member of the U.S women's foil team at the Veterans Fencing World Championships in Stralsund, Germany.

She is married to fellow science fiction writer Geoffrey A. Landis.

Bibliography

Novels

Short fiction
Collections
 
 

Stories

Poetry
Collections
 
 
 
 
List of poems

External links
Official site

References

1940 births
Living people
21st-century American novelists
21st-century American short story writers
21st-century American women writers
American science fiction writers
American women novelists
American women short story writers
Analog Science Fiction and Fact people
Case Western Reserve University alumni
Kent State University faculty
Nebula Award winners
Oberlin College alumni
Women science fiction and fantasy writers
Novelists from Ohio
American women academics